Kirkelandet is an island in Kristiansund Municipality in Møre og Romsdal county, Norway.  The island is split in two by the Vågen inlet, with the western half called Kirkelandet and the eastern half called Gomalandet.  The name of the island means "church land", since it has been the historic site of a church.  Today, Kirkelandet Church is located on the western part of the island.

This is the main island of the city of Kristiansund, with the island of Innlandet to the southwest, the island of Nordlandet to the southeast, and the island of Skorpa to the east.  The main highway on the island is Norwegian National Road 70.  The Sørsund Bridge connects the island to Innlandet and the Nordsund Bridge connects it to the island of Nordlandet.  The Atlantic Ocean Tunnel connects it to the island to Averøya to the west.

See also
List of islands of Norway

References

Kristiansund
Islands of Møre og Romsdal